Bevensen-Ebstorf is a Samtgemeinde ("collective municipality") in the district of Uelzen, in Lower Saxony, Germany. Its seat is in the town Bad Bevensen. It was formed on 1 November 2011 by the merger of the former Samtgemeinden Bevensen and Altes Amt Ebstorf.

The Samtgemeinde Bevensen-Ebstorf consists of the following municipalities:

 Altenmedingen
 Bad Bevensen1, 2
 Barum
 Emmendorf
 Ebstorf
 Hanstedt
 Himbergen
 Jelmstorf
 Natendorf
 Römstedt
 Schwienau
 Weste
 Wriedel

Samtgemeinden in Lower Saxony
Uelzen (district)